The 1994 Miami Redskins football team was an American football team that represented Miami University in the Mid-American Conference (MAC) during the 1994 NCAA Division I-A football season. In its fifth season under head coach Randy Walker, the team compiled a 5–5–1 record (5–3 against MAC opponents), finished in a tie for third place in the MAC, and outscored all opponents by a combined total of 262 to 260.

The team's statistical leaders included Neil Dougherty with 1,431 passing yards, Deland McCullough with 1,103 rushing yards, and Eric Henderson with 560 receiving yards.

Schedule

References

Miami
Miami RedHawks football seasons
Miami Redskins football